Robert N. Carson (born January 23, 1989) is an American former professional baseball pitcher who is currently the pitching coach for the Québec Capitales of the Frontier League. He played in Major League Baseball for the New York Mets.

Career

New York Mets

The New York Mets drafted Carson in the 14th round of the 2007 MLB Draft out of Hattiesburg High School. He started the 2012 season with the Class-AA Binghamton Mets of the Eastern League. The Mets first promoted him to the majors on April 24, but he didn't make an appearance before he was sent back to Binghamton. On May 17, Carson was recalled back to New York, and D. J. Carrasco was designated for assignment. Carson made his major league debut on May 18, 2012, when he pitched a scoreless inning of relief against the Toronto Blue Jays in a 14–5 Mets loss.

Carson started the 2013 season with the Triple-A Las Vegas 51s, and was called up by the Mets on April 21 when Aaron Laffey was designated for assignment. In June 2013, Carson was sent down again to Triple-A Las Vegas. In parts of two seasons with the Mets, he pitched in 31 games with a 6.82 ERA.

Los Angeles Angels of Anaheim

Carson was claimed off waivers by the Los Angeles Angels of Anaheim on October 17, 2013. He pitched in 14 games for the AAA Salt Lake Bees and was 0–1 with a 10.34 ERA. The Angels released him on May 10, 2014.

Los Angeles Dodgers

Carson signed a minor league deal with the Los Angeles Dodgers on May 17, 2014, and was assigned to the AA Chattanooga Lookouts. He had a 2.12 ERA in 11 appearances for the Lookouts and was then promoted to the AAA Albuquerque Isotopes, where he was 2–5 with a 5.41 ERA in 18 appearances. He remained with the Dodgers and received a non-roster invite to Major League spring training for 2015. That spring training invitation was rescinded when Carson received a 50-game suspension for violating baseball's drug policy by testing positive for a drug of abuse. He was released by the Dodgers in June.

Bridgeport Bluefish
Carson signed with the Bridgeport Bluefish on June 16, 2015. He became a free agent after the 2015 season.

Acereros de Monclova
He signed with the Acereros de Monclova of the Mexican League for the 2016 season. He was released on May 9, 2016.

Bridgeport Bluefish
Carson signed with the Bridgeport Bluefish of the Atlantic League of Professional Baseball on May 18.

Southern Maryland Blue Crabs
Carson was traded to the Southern Maryland Blue Crabs of the Atlantic League on May 26. He became a free agent after the 2017 season.

York Revolution
On April 4, 2018, Carson signed with the York Revolution of the Atlantic League of Professional Baseball. He became a free agent following the 2018 season, but later re-signed with the Revolution on May 7, 2019. He became a free agent after the 2019 season.

Lexington Legends
On February 26, 2021, Carson signed with the Lexington Legends of the Atlantic League of Professional Baseball. He became a free agent following the season.

Coaching career
On April 4, 2022, Carson was hired by the Québec Capitales of the Frontier League to serve as the pitching coach.

References

External links

1989 births
Living people
Acereros de Monclova players
African-American baseball players
Albuquerque Isotopes players
American expatriate baseball players in Mexico
Baseball players from Mississippi
Binghamton Mets players
Bridgeport Bluefish players
Buffalo Bisons (minor league) players
Cardenales de Lara players
Chattanooga Lookouts players
Gigantes del Cibao players
American expatriate baseball players in the Dominican Republic
Gulf Coast Mets players
Kingsport Mets players
Las Vegas 51s players
Lexington Legends players
Major League Baseball pitchers
Mayos de Navojoa players
Mesa Solar Sox players
Mexican League baseball pitchers
Navegantes del Magallanes players
American expatriate baseball players in Venezuela
New York Mets players
Peoria Javelinas players
Salt Lake Bees players
Savannah Sand Gnats players
Southern Maryland Blue Crabs players
Sportspeople from Hattiesburg, Mississippi
St. Lucie Mets players
Rancho Cucamonga Quakes players
York Revolution players
21st-century African-American sportspeople
20th-century African-American people